Bursovaginoidea is one of the two orders in the phylum Gnathostomulida.

Appearance and anatomy 

Bursovaginoids are rather small, ranging from a half of a millimeter to a full millimeter in length. Many species in the order Bursovaginoidea have a narrow neck, making their head stand out more than other bursovagionoids and all filospermoids.

Bursovaginoids, unlike filospermoids, have paired sensory organs and a penis. Also, all species in Bursovaginoidea have a sperm-storage organ called a bursa. In suborder Scleroperalia, the bursa is cuticular, while in Conophoralia it is not. Species in order Conophoralia tend to have larger sperm than those in Sceloperalia.

Distribution 

Sightings of bursovaginoids have been reported in various parts of the world, including England and the north-western and south-eastern parts of the United States. Bursovaginoids mostly live in oceans near the coasts, in depths of under 500 meters (1650 feet), most commonly around 300.

Families 

The order Bursovaginoidea contains 73 - 75 species and 24 genera in the following 10 families:

 Suborder Conophoralia
 Austrognathiidae (27 species in 4 genera)
 Suborder Scleroperalia
 Agnathiellidae (3 species in 2 genera)
 Clausognathiidae (1 species in 1 genus)
 Gnathostomariidae (1 species in 1 genus)
 Gnathostomulidae (23 - 25 species in 5 genera)
 Mesognathariidae (6 species in 3 genera)
 Onychognathiidae (9 species in 5 genera)
 Paucidentulidae (1 species in 1 genus)
 Problognathiidae (1 species in 1 genus)
 Rastrognathiidae (1 species in 1 genus)

References 

Gnathostomulida
Marine animals